is a railway station in the city of Fuji, Shizuoka Prefecture, Japan, operated by the private railway operator Gakunan Railway.

Lines

Station layout
Gakunan-Fujioka Station has one island platform connected to the station building by a level crossing. It is staffed during the morning commuting period.

Adjacent stations

Station history
Gakunan-Fujioka Station was opened on December 20, 1951.

Passenger statistics
In fiscal 2017, the station was used by an average of 311 passengers daily (boarding passengers only).

Surrounding area
 Fuji High School
 Fuji Yoshinaga No.1 Elementary School
 Fuji Yoshiwara Junior High School
 Fuji City Library

See also
 List of Railway Stations in Japan

References

External links

  

Railway stations in Shizuoka Prefecture
Railway stations in Japan opened in 1951
Fuji, Shizuoka